This is a list of player transfers involving RFU Championship teams before or during the 2017–18 season. The list is of deals that are confirmed and are either from or to a rugby union team in the Championship during the 2016–17 season. On 7 December 2016, London Welsh announced that it is going into voluntary liquidation due to an "unsustainable" financial situation. On 13 May 2017, Hartpury are promoted to the Championship from the 2017-18 season. On 24 May 2017, London Irish are promoted into the Premiership, whilst Bristol are demoted back to the Championship for the 2017-18 season. It is not unknown for confirmed deals to be cancelled at a later date.

Bedford Blues

Players In
 Jarad Williams from  Doncaster Knights
 Seán McCarthy from  Jersey Reds
 Alex Penny from  Ealing Trailfinders
 George Edgson from  Wasps
 Lee Dickson from  Northampton Saints
 Chris Czekaj from  Colomiers
 Will Hooley from  Exeter Chiefs
 Howard Packman from  Northampton Saints
 Tom Lindsay from  Gloucester
 Richard Lane from  Jersey Reds
 Harry Sheppard from  London Scottish

Players Out
 Christian Judge to  Cornish Pirates
 Jake Sharp to  London Scottish
 Tom James to  Doncaster Knights
 James Hallam to  Ealing Trailfinders
 Dan George to  London Scottish
 Mike Howard to  London Scottish
 Jason Hill to  Doncaster Knights
 Byron Hodge to  Rotherham Titans

Bristol

Players In
 Alapati Leiua from  Wasps
 Steven Luatua from  Blues
 Ian Madigan from  Bordeaux
 Sione Faletau from  Yorkshire Carnegie
 Jack Cosgrove from  Edinburgh
 Luke Morahan from  Western Force
 Ehize Ehizode from  Wasps
 George Perkins from  Saracens
 Joe Batley from  Gloucester
 Joe Latta from  Gloucester
 Jason Harris-Wright from  London Irish
 Tyler Gendall from  Harlequins
 Nick Haining from  Jersey Reds
 Reiss Cullen from  Watsonian
 Sam Bedlow from  Sale Sharks
 Mat Protheroe from  Gloucester
 Dan Thomas from  Gloucester
 Chris Vui from  Worcester Warriors
 Ryan Glynn from  Preston Grasshoppers

Players Out
 Charlie Amesbury retired
 Mitch Eadie to  Northampton Saints
 Jamal Ford-Robinson to  Northampton Saints
 Mark Sorenson retired
 Adrian Jarvis retired
 Gavin Henson to  Dragons
 Will Cliff to  Sale Sharks
 Marc Jones to  Sale Sharks
 Rob Hawkins retired
 Ian Evans retired
 Jon Fisher sabbatical
 Alec Carey to  Jersey Reds
 James Hall sabbatical
 Elias Caven to  Hartpury College
 BJ Edwards to  Hartpury College
 Jason Woodward to  Gloucester
 Nick Carpenter to  Hartpury College
 Ben Mosses to  London Scottish
 James Phillips to  Bath
 Ben Glynn to  Harlequins
 Shane Geraghty to  Stade Français
 Anthony Perenise to  Bath
 Kyle Traynor to  Leicester Tigers
 Nick Köster to  Cambridge University
 Alby Mathewson to  Toulon
 Luke Arscott released
 Chris Brooker released
 Martin Roberts released

Cornish Pirates

Players In
 Christian Judge from  Bedford Blues
 Tom Cowan-Dickie from  Plymouth Albion
 Toby Freeman from  Nottingham
 Rupert Cooper from  Plymouth Albion
 Dan Koster from  Canterbury
 Nicholas Coronel from  Lazio
 Angus Taylor from  Redruth
 Sam Matavesi from  Redruth

Players Out
 Rob Elloway retired
 Jack Arnott to  Plymouth Albion
 Luke Chapman to  Plymouth Albion
 Alex Dancer to  Chinnor
 Jake Parker to  Richmond
 Edd Pascoe to  Redruth

Doncaster Knights

Players In
 Morgan Eames from  Nottingham
 Tom Hicks from  Rotherham Titans
 Will Owen from  Rotherham Titans
 Jack Ram from  Northland
 Ian Williams from  Rotherham Titans
 Tom James from  Bedford Blues
 David Nelson from  Newcastle Falcons
 Jason Hill from  Bedford Blues
 Charlie Foley from  Rotherham Titans
 Junior Bulumakau from  Glasgow Warriors
 Owen Evans from  Harlequins

Players Out
 Latu Makaafi to  Coventry
 Jarad Williams to  Bedford Blues
 Seán Scanlon to  Nottingham
 Ed Falkingham to  Hull Ionians
 WillGriff John to  Sale Sharks
 Sam Edgerly to  Oxford University
 Harry Allen retired
 Robin Hislop to  Ayr
 David Nolan to  Malahide
 Beau Robinson released

Ealing Trailfinders

Players In
 Rory Clegg from  Glasgow Warriors
 Peter Lydon from  London Scottish
 Grayson Hart from  Glasgow Warriors
 Mark Tampin from  Jersey Reds
 Lewis Robling from  Jersey Reds
 Ollie Curry from  Rotherham Titans
 James Hallam from  Bedford Blues
 Piers O'Conor from  Wasps
 Daniel Temm from  Newcastle Falcons
 Seb Stegmann from  Yorkshire Carnegie
 Djustice Sears-Duru from  Ontario Blues
 Shane O'Leary from  Connacht

Players Out
 Josh Davies to  Chinnor
 Alex Penny to  Bedford Blues
 Seb Nagle-Taylor to  Jersey Reds
 Tyler Bush to  London Irish Wild Geese
 Alex Bradley to  Chinnor
 Carwyn Jones to  Vannes
 Luke Peters to  Rotherham Titans
 Alex Walker to  London Scottish
 Phil Chesters to  Chinnor
 Curtis Wilson to  Sheffield Eagles 
 Iain Grieve to  Hartpury College
 Rhys Crane to  Rosslyn Park
 Adam Preocanin retired
 Andrew Durutalo to  Worcester Warriors
 Karl Gibson released
 Ignacio Saenz Lancuba released
 Chris York released

Hartpury

Players In
 Elias Caven from  Bristol
 BJ Edwards from  Bristol
 Nick Carpenter from  Bristol
 Dan Murphy from  Harlequins
 Mike Daniels from  Worcester Warriors
 Tom Heard from  Nottingham
 Will Crane from  Birmingham Moseley
 James Williams from  Birmingham Moseley
 Ed Sheldon from  Birmingham Moseley
 Rob Langley from  Nottingham
 Darryl Dyer from  Coventry
 Alex Ducker from  Redruth
 Iain Grieve from  Ealing Trailfinders
 Aquille Smith from  Hull Ionians
 Rupert Harden from  Richmond

Players Out
 Sebastian Negri to  Benetton
 Jake Polledri to  Gloucester
 Jamie Cooke to  Rotherham Titans
 Nathan Taylor to  Cinderford
 Ellie Abrahams to  Jersey Reds

Jersey Reds

Players In
 Conor Joyce from  Ulster
 Seb Nagle-Taylor from  Ealing Trailfinders
 Jared Saunders from  Saracens
 Lee Roy Atalifo from  Canterbury
 Alec Carey from  Bristol
 Jordan Brodley from  Bristol University
 Roy Godfrey from  Wimbledon
 Apakuki Ma'afu from  NSW Country Eagles
 Matt Rogerson from  Sale Sharks
 Mark Best from  Ulster
 Rory Bartle from  London Scottish
 Oliver Bryant from  Leicester Tigers
 Josh Hodson from  Llandovery
 Tom Pincus from  Queensland Country
 Jason Worrall from  Western Province
 Jerry Sexton from  London Irish
 Rory Pitman from  Ebbw Vale
 Tim Duchense from  Darlington Mowden Park
 Scott van Breda from  Western Province
 Ellie Abrahams from  Hartpury College
 Tom Quarrie from  Stade Niçois
 Jake Upfield from  Bond University
 Auguy Slowik from  Worcester Warriors

Players Out
 Heath Stevens to  Coventry
 Simon Kerrod to  Worcester Warriors
 Pierce Phillips to  Worcester Warriors
 Seán McCarthy to  Bedford Blues
 James Freeman to  Exeter Chiefs
 Gary Graham to  Newcastle Falcons
 Nick Haining to  Bristol
 Mark Tampin to  Ealing Trailfinders
 Lewis Robling to  Ealing Trailfinders
 Richard Lane to  Bedford Blues
 Sam Katz to  Massy
 James McKinney to  Fiamme Oro
 Joe Buckle to  Yorkshire Carnegie
 George Watkins to  Yorkshire Carnegie
 Ayron Schramm to  Heidelberger RK
 Nick Scott to  London Scottish
 Jack Cuthbert to  Scotland Sevens
 Samisoni Fisilau released
 Nick Campbell released
 Jordan Davies released

London Scottish

Players In
 Jake Sharp from  Bedford Blues
 Kyle Baillie from  Atlantic Rock
 Derrick Appiah from  Worcester Warriors
 Dan George from  Bedford Blues
 Mike Howard from  Bedford Blues
 Isaac Miller from  Loughborough Students RUFC
 Ben Christie from  Loughborough Students RUFC
 Ed Milne from  Rosslyn Park
 Chris Walker from  Blackheath
 Gregor Gillanders from  Blackheath
 Max Berry from  Loughborough Students RUFC
 Peter Austin from  British Army
 Ross Neal from  London Irish
 Rob Stevenson from  Durham University 
 James Tyas from  Rotherham Titans
 Ben Mosses from  Bristol
 Alex Walker from  Ealing Trailfinders
 Tijuee Uanivi from  Glasgow Warriors
 Nick Scott from  Jersey Reds
 Jonathan Mills from  Sale Sharks
 Fraser Lyle from  Glasgow Warriors
 Dino Waldren from  Blackrock College
  Charlie Ingall from  Sale Sharks

Players Out
 Peter Lydon to  Ealing Trailfinders
 Rory Bartle to  Jersey Reds
 Harry Sheppard to  Bedford Blues
 Jason Harries to  Edinburgh
 Ifereimi Boladau to  Rotherham Titans

Nottingham

Players In
 James Penman from  Darlington Mowden Park
 Tiff Eden from  Worcester Warriors
 Seán Scanlon from  Doncaster Knights
 Danny Qualter from  Connacht
 Rory Burke from  Munster
 Aniseko Sio from  Leicester Lions

Players Out
 Antonio Harris to  Wasps
 Harry Morley to  Coventry
 Morgan Eames to  Doncaster Knights
 Toby Freeman to  Cornish Pirates
 Joe Green to  Chinnor
 Tom Heard to  Hartpury College
 Rob Langley to  Hartpury College
 Lawrence Rayner to  Ampthill
 Connor Bullivant released
 James Stephenson released

Richmond

Players In
 Jake Parker from  Cornish Pirates

Players Out
 Sam Stuart to  Newcastle Falcons
 Adam Peters to  Rotherham Titans
 Rupert Harden to  Hartpury College

Rotherham Titans

Players In
 Matt Shields from  Harlequins
 Rhodri Davies from  Llandovery
 Andrew Foster from  Newcastle Falcons
 James Lasis from  Loughborough Students RUFC
 Rob Louw from  Gala
 Jonny Murphy from  Ulster
 Tom Burns from  Chinnor
 Drew Cheshire from  Birmingham Moseley
 Luke Peters from  Ealing Trailfinders
 Adam Peters from  Richmond
 Byron Hodge from  Bedford Blues
 Brandon Palmer from  Golden Lions
 Wesley Hamilton from  Hawick
 Ifereimi Boladau from  London Scottish
 Yiannis Loizias from  Loughborough Students RUFC
 Guy Borrowdale from  Yorkshire Carnegie
 Jamie Cooke from  Hartpury College
 Francisco Vieira from  CDUP Rugby

Players Out
 Toby Salmon to  Exeter Chiefs
 Joe Hutchinson to  Chinnor
 Tom Hicks to  Doncaster Knights
 Will Owen to  Doncaster Knights
 Ollie Curry to  Ealing Trailfinders
 Ian Williams to  Doncaster Knights
 Jack Hayes to  Cinderford
 Danny Herriott to  Blackheath
 Ricky Cano to  Plymouth Albion
 Buster Lawrence to  Birmingham Moseley
 Charlie Foley to  Doncaster Knights
 Matt Dudman to  Darlington Mowden Park 
 Darren Oliver to  Chinnor
 Jack Ramshaw to  Chinnor
 James Tyas to  London Scottish
 Joe Rees to  Merthyr

Yorkshire Carnegie

Players In
 Callum Irvine from  Hull Ionians
 Joe Buckle from  Jersey Reds
 George Watkins from  Jersey Reds
 Marc Thomas from  Cardiff Blues

Players Out
 Ryan Burrows to  Newcastle Falcons
 Lewis Boyce to  Harlequins
 Sione Faletau to  Bristol
 Taylor Prell to  Warrington Wolves
 Dean Schofield retired
 Phil Nilsen to  Coventry
 Seb Stegmann to  Ealing Trailfinders
 Alex Gray retired
 Guy Borrowdale to  Rotherham Titans
 Joe Ford to  Leicester Tigers
 Jonah Holmes to  Leicester Tigers
 Warren Seals to  Darlington Mowden Park
 Andy Saull retired

See also
List of 2017–18 Premiership Rugby transfers
List of 2017–18 Pro14 transfers
List of 2017–18 Super Rugby transfers
List of 2017–18 Top 14 transfers

References

2017-18
2017–18 RFU Championship